Amaurys Perez (born 18 March 1976 in Camagüey, Cuba) is an Italian water polo player. At the 2012 Summer Olympics, he competed for the Italy men's national water polo team in the men's event, winning the silver medal. He considers himself Catholic.

See also
 List of Olympic medalists in water polo (men)
 List of world champions in men's water polo
 List of World Aquatics Championships medalists in water polo

References

External links
 
 

1976 births
Living people
Cuban male water polo players
Italian male water polo players
Water polo centre backs
Water polo players at the 2012 Summer Olympics
Medalists at the 2012 Summer Olympics
Olympic silver medalists for Italy in water polo
World Aquatics Championships medalists in water polo
Sportspeople from Camagüey
Naturalised citizens of Italy
Cuban expatriate sportspeople in Italy
Cuban emigrants to Italy
Expatriate water polo players
Cuban Roman Catholics
Italian Roman Catholics